William A. Halteman (June 27, 1860 – October 20, 1945) was an American politician in the state of Washington. He served in the Washington House of Representatives.

References

Members of the Washington House of Representatives
1860 births
1945 deaths
Politicians from Dayton, Ohio